"It Ended on an Oily Stage" was the first published single from British Sea Power's second album Open Season. It reached number 18 in the UK Singles Chart and was critically praised, with the NME giving it their Track of the Week award. It received heavy airplay from the alternative radio sector. This track was previously called "Elegiac Stanzas" but was renamed when the band questioned whether radio presenters would be able to pronounce it.

Track listings

Cd (rtradscd220)
 "It Ended on an Oily Stage" (BSP) – 4:23
 "Green Grass of Tunnel" (Gunnar Tynes/Kristín Anna Valtýsdóttir/Gyda Valtýsdóttir/Örvar Smârason) – 5:23

E-CD (RTRADSCDX220)
 "It Ended on an Oily Stage" (BSP) – 4:23
 "When I Go Out (from the Evangeline sessions)" (Yan) – 2:44
 "Crystal Horse" (Hamilton/BSP) – 2:43

Also features the promo video for "It Ended on an Oily Stage" as a CD-ROM extra.

7" Vinyl (RTRADS220)
 "It Ended on an Oily Stage" (BSP) – 4:23
 "Don't You Want to Be a Bird?" (Hamilton/BSP) – 2:48

References

External links
 Official website
 "It Ended on an Oily Stage" at Salty Water (fansite)

British Sea Power songs
2005 singles
2005 songs
Rough Trade Records singles
UK Independent Singles Chart number-one singles